Agrahara, Sira  is a village in the southern state of Karnataka, India. It is located in the Sira taluk of Tumkur district in Karnataka.

See also
 Tumkur
 Districts of Karnataka
 Handikunte post, near Baragur, Sira Taluk.

References

External links
 http://Tumkur.nic.in/

Villages in Tumkur district